Stefan Grimm (1963–2014) was a German biologist and professor of toxicology at Imperial College London. He researched signalling cascades in the development of tumours.

Grimm was found dead in Northwood, Middlesex on 25 September 2014 after being told that he was "struggling to fulfil the metrics" of a professorial post by his head of department. The coroner described his death as "needless".

Early career 
Grimm studied for his PhD under the supervision of Patrick Bäuerle at the University of Tübingen, working on the role of NFκB in cell transformation and apoptosis. From 1995 to 1998 he was postdoctoral fellow with Philip Leder at Harvard University, he then took up a junior post as a group leader at the Max Planck Institute of Biochemistry. In 2004 he moved to Imperial College London, where he was appointed Professor of Toxicology.

Grimm's research programme focused primarily on apoptosis, signalling pathways, and tumour-genesis. Here, he made fundamental contributions to the understanding of the molecular and cellular mechanisms of cell death in connection with the development of cancer. In 20 years, he published 50 journal articles, two books, and filed 5 patent applications.

Death and Events at Imperial College London 
Grimm was found dead at his home in Middlesex on 25 September 2014, with typed notes next to his body. His inquest ruled that he took his life by asphyxiation. One month after his death, on 21 October, an email with the subject line "How Professors are treated at Imperial College", apparently set to deliver on a delay timer, was sent from the "professorstefangrimm" prefixed email address to senior members of the medical faculty.

In the email Grimm, describes how his head of department told him that although he had submitted the highest number of grant applications in the medical faculty, and despite already acquiring £135,000 in grant income, he needed to obtain a programme grant or '"start to give serious consideration as to whether you are performing at the expected level of a Professor at Imperial College."
In his last email Grimm had this to say of the senior staff in his faculty:These formidable leaders are playing an interesting game: They hire scientists from other countries to submit the work that they did abroad under completely different conditions for the Research Assessment that is supposed to gauge the performance of British universities. Afterwards they leave them alone to either perform with grants or being kicked out. Even if your work is submitted to this Research Assessment and brings in money for the university, you are targeted if your grant income is deemed insufficient. Those submitted to the research assessment hence support those colleagues who are unproductive but have grants. Grant income is all that counts here, not scientific output.Of Imperial College London he said, This is not a university anymore but a business with [a] very few up in the hierarchy... profiteering [while] the rest of us are milked for money, be it professors for their grant income or students who pay 100 pounds just to extend their write-up status.The Rector of Imperial College, Alice Gast gave credence to Grimm's analogy, when she described university professors as "really like small business owners... they have their own research and they have their research funding to look after."

On 1 December, David Colquhoun, Emeritus Professor of Pharmacology at UCL and long-time critic of managerialism and research assessment in British Universities wrote a blog post entitled “Publish and perish at Imperial College London: the death of Stefan Grimm." Colquhoun published both Grimm's email and the emails sent by his head of department.  The post was viewed 196,000 times in the year after Grimm's death. The day after it was posted Colquhoun's web server received so many page requests it failed.

Colquhoun described Imperial's performance targets as "a recipe for short term, unoriginal research. It’s an incentive to cut corners... It is a prostitution of science."

On 4 December, Imperial issued a statement via Caroline Davis, its Communications and Public Affairs Reporter. The statement expressed sadness at the "tragic loss" of Professor Grimm and reported that "senior colleagues have offered their deepest condolences to Stefan’s family on behalf of the college and all those affected by this tragedy". The statement denied "claims appearing on the internet...[that] Professor Grimm's work was ... under formal review [or that]... he had been given any notice of dismissal."

Imperial commissioned an internal review into its performance management procedures, commenting:"Professor Grimm had been under review in the informal process for nearly two years. His line manager was using this period to help Professor Grimm obtain funding or alternative work (the review panel saw evidence of the efforts made in this regard). The subsequent formal process would have involved a minimum of two formal meetings with time to improve in-between formal meetings before consideration would have been given to the termination of Professor Grimm’s employment. Understandably there is a reluctance to move into formal hearings, particularly when the member of staff is hard working and diligent, but the formal stages would have provided more clarity to Professor Grimm on process and support through the written documentation, representation at meetings and HR involvement.""It is recommended that the new capability procedure and ordinance include greater clarity on timescales for informal action and how this might operate in different roles."Colquhoun commented: "It seems to be absurd to describe...[the head of department's email]... as an attempt to 'help' Professor Grimm. It was a direct threat to the livelihood of a competent 51 year-old full professor. Having flow charts for the bullying would not have helped."

References

Academics of Imperial College London
Bullying
Workplace bullying
2014 deaths
Suicides in England
University of Tübingen alumni
1963 births
2014 suicides